Moloundou is an arrondissement (district) in the Boumba-et-Ngoko Division of southeastern Cameroon's East Province. Mouloundou is close to Boumba Bek and Nki National Parks on the Dja River. It has a mayor and several decentralised administrative services.

History
In the 1890s, Moloundou was "one of the richest rubber areas of Africa" and Germans established a rubber making plant here.

Geography and climate
Mouloundou is situated roughly 280 km from the Cameroonian Republic of Congo border town of Yokadouma. It is close to Boumba Bek and Nki National Parks on the Dja River. The town has a tropical climate with temperature ranging from 23.1–25˚C with an average annual temperature of 24˚C. Its relative humidity varies between 60 and 90% while annual rainfall is 1500mm per year. According to the Cameroon Ministry of Agriculture, Moloundou has a rainy season from September to November, a dry season from November to March, a rainy season from March to June, and a dry season from July to August.

Demographics
The area around Mouloundou, as defined by the World Wildlife Fund, has a population of 22,882 people, mostly ethnic Bantus and, despite being named a minority in Cameroon's constitution of 18 January 1996, Baka Pygmies. These include the Djem, Bangando, Bakwele and Zime tribes. Non-indigenous employees of logging companies and traders make up a sizeable amount of the population. The population density of the region is about five people per km2, concentrated along the main Yokadouma-Moloundou road. The villages near Mouloundou are mostly homogeneous as there are few non-natives, mostly working as civil servants or traders.

References

Populated places in East Region (Cameroon)